Franco Farid Pérez (born 4 November 1998) is an Argentine professional footballer who plays as a forward for FC Tucson on loan from Aldosivi.

Career
Pérez started his career with Aldosivi. During the 2018–19 Argentine Primera División campaign, the forward was promoted to the club's senior squad for a fixture with San Lorenzo on 2 December 2018; coming off the substitutes bench with seven minutes remaining and subsequently assisting Aldosivi's second equaliser of a 2–2 draw.

On 11 February 2022, Pérez signed on loan with USL League One side FC Tucson for their 2022 season.

Career statistics
.

References

External links

1998 births
Living people
Sportspeople from Buenos Aires Province
Argentine footballers
Association football forwards
Argentine Primera División players
Aldosivi footballers
FC Tucson players